Antoine de Lalaing or Antoon van Lalaing may refer to:
Antoine I de Lalaing (1480–1540), 1st count of Hoogstraten and of Culemborg
Antoine II de Lalaing (1533–1568), 3rd count of Hoogstraten